Mickey Leland College Preparatory Academy for Young Men (MLCPA), originally Young Men's College Preparatory Academy at E. O. Smith (YMCPA), is a university preparatory secondary school for boys in the Fifth Ward, Houston, Texas. It is a part of the Houston Independent School District. It is named after Mickey Leland.

The school opened in August, 2011 for the 6th and 9th grades, and will gradually become a middle and high school. It first opened in the E.O. Smith Education Center campus in the Fifth Ward. The district modeled the school off of the Chicago Urban Prep Academy in Chicago. The school has admission requirements. It later moved to the former Crawford Elementary School, in both the Fifth Ward and in Northside.

Some Fifth Ward community members expressed disappointment that the previous E.O. Smith students would be displaced by the opening of the new magnet school.

The HISD board approved the renaming of the school to Leland College Preparatory Academy in 2014.

HISD plans to build the permanent Leland school on the site of the former Carter Career Center, which once served as Wheatley High School and E.O. Smith. The new building will look similar to the original one.

See also

 Young Women's College Preparatory Academy

References

External links
 Young Men's College Preparatory Academy
 Young Men's College Preparatory Academy at Houston ISD
 Delony, Doug. "HISD Board Approves All-Boys College Prep Academy" (Archive). KRIV. Thursday December 9, 2010.
 "Board Approves Creation of All-Boys College Preparatory Academy." Houston ISD. December 10, 2010. (PDF Press Release)

Public boys' schools in the United States
Public high schools in Houston
Public middle schools in Houston
Houston Independent School District middle schools
Houston Independent School District high schools
Boys' schools in Texas
Educational institutions established in 2011
2011 establishments in Texas